Durrell Mohammad (born May 3, 1979), better known by his stage name Hell Rell, is an American rapper.

Career

In 2007, he signed with Koch Records and began working on his debut album, For the Hell of It. The album reached No. 5 on both the Billboard Top Independent Albums and Top Rap Albums chart, and No. 10 on the Top R&B/Hip-Hop Albums.

Discography

Albums
2007: For the Hell of It
2008: Black Mask, Black Gloves
2009: Get in Line or Get Lined Up
2009: Hard as Hell
2019: "Forgive but Never Forget"

Other albums
2007: Eat with Me or Eat a Box of Bullets
2009: Live from Hell
2009: Hell Up in the Bronx

Compilation albums
2009: Hell Rell Hosts: Straight Outta Harlem (The Ultimate Uptown Collection)

Collaboration mixtapes
2007: Double Trouble (with J.R. Writer)
2007: Year of the Gun (with 40 Cal.)
2011: Gun Clap (with J.R. Writer)
2011: Guilty by Association (with J. Stalin & Lord Geez)
2012: Bronx Tales (with Yung JB)

Solo mixtapes
2004: Fire & Ice (Mixed by DJ Sickamore)
2005: Streets Wanna Know
2006: New Gun in Town
2008: Top Gunna: The Ruga Edition
2009: The Extermination: Return to the Grind
2010: Bullpen Therapy
2010: You need People like Me: The Return of the Black Mask
2010: Black Masks Black Gloves: Ruga Edition
2011: Million Dollar Dreams Federal Nightmares
2011: Us never Them - The Mixtape
2011: The Black Cloud
2012: Not Guilty
2013: Streets Wanna Know 2: Valentines Day Massacre
2013: The Meyer Lansky Project
2014: Walking Brick
2015: O.N.Y.G. (Mixed by DJ Sam Hoody)
2017: The Scale

Guest appearances

 Mixtape Album by Hell Rell and Glaze

References

External links
 Hell Rell at Billboard
Hell Rell on Myspace
Hell Rell interview with hiphopgame.com 
Hell Rell Interview, Dec 30, 2009

African-American male rappers
Living people
1979 births
East Coast hip hop musicians
The Diplomats members
Place of birth missing (living people)
Rappers from the Bronx
African-American songwriters
American prisoners and detainees
Songwriters from New York (state)
Gangsta rappers
21st-century American rappers